

Flora

Ferns and fern allies

Cycads

Angiosperms

Arthropods

Insects

Mollusca

Newly named bivalves

Fish

Newly named actinopterygii ("ray-finned fish")

Archosauromorphs
 Ornithomimid gastroliths documented.

Newly named dinosauriforms

Newly named dinosaurs
Data courtesy of George Olshevsky's dinosaur genera list.

Newly named birds

Newly named pterosaurs

Lepidosauromorphs

Newly named plesiosaurs

Newly named scincomorphans

References

 
1990s in paleontology
Paleontology